Tristan Lamasine and Nils Langer were the defending champions but chose not to defend their title.

Sanchai and Sonchat Ratiwatana won the title after defeating Jeevan Nedunchezhiyan and Ramkumar Ramanathan 7–5, 6–4 in the final.

Seeds

Draw

References
 Main Draw
 Qualifying Draw

Vietnam Open (tennis) - Doubles